Stephen Barker (1846 – 21 June 1924) was an English-born Australian politician. Born in Sussex, he received a primary education before becoming a tailor. He migrated to Australia where he became an organiser of the Tramways Union. He served as secretary of the Melbourne Trades Hall Council from 1901 to 1910. In 1910, he was elected to the Australian Senate as a Labor Senator from Victoria. He was defeated in 1919, but re-elected in 1922. However, he died in 1924, and Joseph Hannan was appointed as his replacement.

References

1846 births
1924 deaths
Australian Labor Party members of the Parliament of Australia
Members of the Australian Senate for Victoria
Members of the Australian Senate
Australian trade unionists
20th-century Australian politicians
English emigrants to colonial Australia
Australian tailors